Give It Up may refer to:

Literature
 "Give It Up!" (short story), a story by Franz Kafka
 Give It Up! (comics), an adaptation of nine short stories by Kafka

Music

Albums
 Give It Up (Bonnie Raitt album), 1972
 Give It Up (Jimmy Lyons album), 1985

Songs
 "Give It Up" (The Good Men song), 1992
 "Give It Up" (Hothouse Flowers song), 1990
 "Give It Up" (KC and the Sunshine Band song), 1983
 "Give It Up" (Nathan Sykes song), 2016
 "Give It Up" (Public Enemy song), 1994
 "Give It Up" (Talk Talk song), 1986
 "Give It Up" (Twista song), 2007
 "Give It Up" (Wilson Phillips song), 1992
 "Give It Up", by AC/DC from Stiff Upper Lip
 "Give It Up", by Alice Cooper from Constrictor
 "Give It Up", by Avalon from Avalon
 "Give It Up", by Badfinger from Badfinger
 "Give It Up", by Boney M. from Eye Dance
 "Give It Up", by Datarock from Red
 "Give It Up", by The Jacksons from Triumph
 "Give It Up", by Jacynthe
 "Give It Up", by Kevin Aviance
 "Give It Up", by LCD Soundsystem from LCD Soundsystem
 "Give It Up", by Midtown from Forget What You Know
 "Give It Up", by Pepper from Kona Town
 "Give It Up", by Steve Miller Band from Abracadabra
 "Give It Up", by ZZ Top from Recycler
 "Give It Up", from the Victorious TV series soundtrack

Television episodes
 "Give It Up" (8 Simple Rules)
 "Give It Up" (Noah's Arc)
 "Give It Up" (Shake It Up)

Other uses
 Give It Up! (video game), a rhythm video game released in 2014

See also
 "Give It Up or Turnit a Loose", a song by James Brown
 "Give It Up, Turn It Loose", a song by En Vogue
 
 Givin' It Up, a 2006 album by George Benson and Al Jarreau
 Give Up (disambiguation)
 Giving Up (disambiguation)